Château de la Fauconnière may refer to the following French châteaux:

Château de la Fauconnière (Allier)

Château de la Fauconnière (Vendée)